This is a map of European countries by GNI (gross national income nominal) per capita for year 2021. High income in purple ($13,205 or more, as defined by the World Bank), upper middle income in orange ($4,256 and $13,205), and lower middle income ($1,086 and $4,255) in red.

Explanation
For the current 2021 fiscal year, low-income economies are defined as those with a GNI per capita, calculated using the World Bank Atlas method, of $1,085 or less in 2021; lower middle-income economies are those with a GNI per capita between $1,086 and $4,255; upper middle-income economies are those with a GNI per capita between $4,256 and $13,205; high-income economies are those with a GNI per capita of $13,205 or more.

See also 
World Bank high-income economy
International organisations in Europe 
List of European countries by budget revenues
List of European countries by budget revenues per capita
List of European countries by GDP (nominal) per capita
List of European countries by GDP (PPP) per capita 
List of European countries by GNI (PPP) per capita
List of sovereign states in Europe by net average wage
List of countries by GDP (nominal) per capita
List of countries by GDP (PPP) per capita
List of countries by GDP (nominal)
List of countries by GDP (PPP)
List of countries by GNI (nominal) per capita

Notes

References

GNI
GNI nominal, Europea
GNI